William Usmar (4 October 1812 – 12 May 1879) was an English cricketer who played for Kent. He was born and died in West Malling.

Usmar made a single first-class appearance in 1841, against Sussex. As an upper-middle order batsman, he was bowled out by William Lillywhite in the first innings in which he batted, and finished not out for 0 in his second innings.

References

1812 births
1879 deaths
English cricketers
Kent cricketers
People from West Malling